is a train station in Kōshi, Kumamoto Prefecture, Japan. It is on the Kikuchi Line, operated by the Kumamoto Electric Railway. Trains arrive every thirty minutes.

Lines
Kumamoto Electric Railway
Kikuchi Line

References

Kumamoto Electric Railway Kikuchi Line
Railway stations in Kumamoto Prefecture
Railway stations in Japan opened in 1965